Eshtehard County (Ŝhahrestān-e Eŝtāhārd) is in Alborz province, Iran. The capital of the county is the city of Eshtehard. At the 2006 census, the region's population (as Eshtehard District of Karaj County, Tehran province) was 23,601 in 6,716 households. It was separated from Karaj County in 2012 to become Eshtehard County in recently established Alborz province. At the 2016 census, the population of the county was 37,876 in 11,731 households.

Administrative divisions

The population history and structural changes of Eshtehard County's administrative divisions over two censuses are shown in the following table. The latest census shows two districts, four rural districts, and one city.

References 

 

Counties of Alborz Province